U. K. Anandavardhanan (born 25 May 1976) is an Indian mathematician specialising in  automorphic forms and representation theory. He was awarded the Shanti Swarup Bhatnagar Prize for Science and Technology, the highest science award in India, for the year 2020 in mathematical science category. He is affiliated to Indian Institute of Technology, Bombay.

After completing undergraduate studies in University of Calicut, Anandavardhanan joined University of Hyderabad for further studies. He secured M Sc in mathematics from there in 1998 and Ph D in 2003. He was with Tata Institute of Fundamental Research during February 2003 - July 2005 and spent the spring of 2004 in University of Iowa. He has been a faculty member of Indian Institute of Technology Bombay since July 2005.

Awards
In addition to the Shanti Swarup Bhatnagar Prize, he has been conferred the following awards also:

Young Scientist Platinum Jubilee Award, National Academy of Sciences, India, Allahabad, 2009.
INSA Medal for Young Scientist, Indian National Science Academy, New Delhi, 2008.

References

External links

21st-century Indian mathematicians
Recipients of the Shanti Swarup Bhatnagar Award in Mathematical Science
Living people
1976 births